Chewings may refer to:

Charles Chewings (1859–1937), Australian geologist and anthropologist
John Chewings (born 1920), New Zealand politician